Rota Erimariki Onorio  (26 October 1919 – 14 September 2004) was an I-Kiribati politician who served as Acting President as Chairman of the Council of State of Kiribati from 10 December 1982 to 18 February 1983, and also as Speaker of the House of Assembly from 1979 to 1982. He was born in Arorae. He was appointed an MBE in the 1970 Birthday Honours. Onorio died on 14 September 2004, at the age of 84. His daughter, Teima Onorio, served as Vice President of Kiribati from 2003 to 2016.

References

1919 births
2004 deaths
Members of the Order of the British Empire
People from the Gilbert Islands
Speakers of the House of Assembly of Kiribati